Cyril II (died June 1640) was three-time Ecumenical Patriarch of Constantinople (1633, 1635–1636, 1638–1639). He was from Veroia, coming to Constantinople in 1618.

Cyril Lucaris' popularity among high clergy made leadership more difficult for Cyril II, who had to contend with their undermining of his authority.

Though recognized as a true Patriarch, he made a Catholic profession of faith.

References

1640 deaths
17th-century Ecumenical Patriarchs of Constantinople